Shihabuddin Am'aq was a 12th-century Persian (Tajik) poet.

Originating from Bukhara, he was an imposing poet that carried the title amir al-shu'ara ("Amir of poets") in the Khaqanid courts. An excellent panegyrist and composer of elegies, he was praised by Anvari.

His mathnavi no longer exists, but it is said to have been written on the story of Yusof and Zoleikha (Joseph and Potiphar's wife).

It is said that he lived a long life of over 100 years and died in 1148 CE.

See also

List of Persian poets and authors
Persian literature

References

 Jan Rypka, History of Iranian Literature. Reidel Publishing Company. ASIN B-000-6BXVT-K

Persian-language poets
12th-century Persian-language poets
11th-century births
1148 deaths
Year of birth unknown
12th-century Iranian people